The Stony Brook Seawolves men's soccer team is a collegiate soccer team that competes in NCAA Division I and in the Colonial Athletic Association.

History

Coaching record

Postseason record

NCAA Tournament 
Stony Brook has appeared in three NCAA Tournaments. Their record is 1–2–1

References

External links
 

 
Association football clubs established in 1963
1963 establishments in New York (state)